The 2000 St Albans City and District Council election took place on 4 May 2000 to elect members of St Albans District Council in Hertfordshire, England. One third of the council was up for election and the council stayed under no overall control.

After the election, the composition of the council was:
Liberal Democrats 23
Conservative 19
Labour 15
Independent 1

Election result
Overall turnout at the election was 33.56%, down from 37.1% at the 1999 election.

Ward results

By-elections between 2000 and 2002

Park Street
A by-election was held in Park Street ward on 12 October 2000 after the resignation of Liberal Democrat councillor Barry Blackwall.

Sopwell

References

2000
2000 English local elections
2000s in Hertfordshire